Horace Sydney Dawswell (21 January 1896 – 11 January 1966) was a gymnast who represent Great Britain at the 1920 Summer Olympics.

Dawswell was part of the gymnastic team that competed in the men's team event in Antwerp, unfortunately the team finish fifth out of five teams.

References

1896 births
1966 deaths
British male artistic gymnasts
Gymnasts at the 1920 Summer Olympics
Olympic gymnasts of Great Britain